Goshen and Little North Mountain Wildlife Management Area is a protected area located in Rockbridge and Augusta counties, Virginia. At , it is the largest Wildlife Management Area managed by the Virginia Department of Game and Inland Fisheries. Three major mountains (Bratton, Forge, and Hogback) are found within the heavily forested area, in addition to a lesser amount of native herbaceous habitat.

Goshen and Little North Mountain Wildlife Management Area lies adjacent to George Washington National Forest and the Goshen Pass Natural Area Preserve. It is open to the public for hunting, trapping, fishing, hiking, horseback riding, and primitive camping. Access for persons 17 years of age or older requires a valid hunting or fishing permit, or a WMA access permit.

See also
 List of Virginia Wildlife Management Areas

References

External links
Virginia Department of Game and Inland Fisheries: Goshen and Little North Mountain Wildlife Management Area

Wildlife management areas of Virginia
Protected areas of Rockbridge County, Virginia
Protected areas of Augusta County, Virginia